Golf at the 2001 Southeast Asian Games was held from 10 September to 16 September. All events were held at the Sungai Long Golf and Country Club, Selangor, Malaysia.

Medalists

Men

Women

Medal table
Legend

References

External links
 

2001
2001 Southeast Asian Games
Southeast Asian Games
2001 Southeast Asian Games events